Emil Utitz (27 May 1883 – 2 November 1956) was a Czech philosopher and psychologist of Jewish descent. He was educated in Prague, where he was a classmate of Franz Kafka. After studies in Munich, Leipzig, and Prague, he became a professor in Rostock, and from 1925 was Chair of Philosophy at the University of Halle-Wittenberg. After his forced retirement in 1933, he became a professor in Prague. In 1942, he was deported to Theresienstadt Ghetto, where he was head of the library. After the liberation of Theresienstadt in 1945, he returned to Prague. Utitz died in Jena in 1956, while travelling through East Germany to give lectures.

Early life and education 

Emil Utitz was born in Roztoky near Prague on 27 May 1883. He grew up in Roztoky with his sister Flora. Their parents were Gotthold Utitz (1855–1916), a manufacturer of leather goods, and his wife Philippina. A German-speaking Jew, he was educated in Prague, first at a Piarist elementary school, then at the  secondary school in the Kinský Palace, where Franz Kafka was a classmate. After passing his , Utitz studied at the University of Munich. After starting with law in 1901, he moved on to philosophy, psychology, art history and archeology, returning to Prague to study at Charles University in 1903, where Anton Marty was one of his teachers. In 1904, he spent one semester at the University of Leipzig and took classes with Wilhelm Wundt and Johannes Volkelt. He defended his PhD in 1906 under the supervision of Christian von Ehrenfels, with the thesis  (Wilhelm Heinse and aesthetics in the German Enlightenment).

Utitz also wrote poems. His  (On Life's Final Mysteries: A Lyrical Symphony in Three Movements) appeared in 1902, and in the same year, he used the pseudonym Ernst Limé to publish the collection  (My Stronghold).

Academic career 

After his doctorate, Utitz travelled to Italy, spending time with Franz Brentano in Florence. Supported by Max Dessoir, he found a teaching position at the University of Rostock in 1910 and obtained the habilitation qualification in November 1910. Afterwards, he taught at a Prague secondary school for a few years. Utitz married Ottilie Schwarzkopf, the daughter of a Jewish factory owner from Sušice, in 1914. They had no children. In 1916, he received a titular professorship at Rostock, becoming a regular tenured professor in 1924. Although he had converted to Protestantism, he was considered Jewish in the context of the so-called Law for the Restoration of the Professional Civil Service and was suspended in April 1933, then forced into unpaid retirement in October 1933. He was forcibly retired in 1938 after arguments with Nazi colleagues.

His PhD students include Hermann Boeschenstein (The Aesthetics of J. P. de Crousaz, Rostock 1924) and Johannes Güthling (Comparative Studies of the Visual Judgement for Distance and Area, Halle 1927).

Utitz's works include books on art theory, aesthetics, characterology and cultural philosophy, as well as books about Brentano and Egon Erwin Kisch.

Theresienstadt 
Utitz and his wife were deported to Theresienstadt Ghetto on 30 July 1942. The library started with about 4,000 books, most of them theological or scholarly works in Hebrew or German. Within a year, the collection had grown to over 48,000 volumes. When the reading room opened in June 1943, use was restricted to readers who could pay a deposit and pass an interview with Utitz or another librarian.
Utitz, who was one of the "prominent" prisoners given special treatment, was involved in cultural activities in Theresienstadt, for example as judge in a poetry contest in 1944. He also gave lectures, one of which was filmed for the 1944 propaganda film Theresienstadt. The manuscript of Viktor Ullmann's opera Der Kaiser von Atlantis was saved by Utitz when Ullman was deported to Auschwitz in October 1944 and later given to H. G. Adler.
Utitz and his assistant, who preserved the Theresienstadt Papers, were the only library staff to survive until the liberation of Theresienstadt in May 1945, and spent three more months in the camp to oversee the disbanding of the library, with 100,000 books returned to Prague.
Utitz later wrote a book about the psychology of life in Theresienstadt, which appeared in a Czech edition in 1947 and in German translation in 1948.

Later life and death 
After the liberation of Theresienstadt, he returned to Prague and was again named professor of philosophy at the university. As emeritus professor, he lived in Smíchov. Utitz became a member of the Communist Party of Czechoslovakia in 1948. While travelling to give lectures in East Germany, he died in Jena on 2 November 1956 from a heart attack.

References

Footnotes

Sources 

1883 births
1956 deaths
20th-century Czech philosophers
People from Prague-West District
Theresienstadt Ghetto survivors
Czech Jews